1995 Verdy Kawasaki season

Review and events
Verdy Kawasaki won J.League NICOS series (second stage).

League results summary

League results by round

Competitions

Domestic results

J.League

J.League Championship

Emperor's Cup

Super Cup

Sanwa Bank Cup

International results

Asian Club Championship

Player statistics

 † player(s) joined the team after the opening of this season.

Transfers

In:

Out:

Transfers during the season

In
 Kazuyoshi Miura (loan return from Genoa on June)

Out
 Mitsuhiro Kawamoto (to Brummel Sendai)
 Takayuki Yamaguchi (to Brummel Sendai)
 Yoshinori Abe (to Brummel Sendai)

Awards
J.League Best XI:  Shinkichi Kikuchi,  Tetsuji Hashiratani,  Bismarck,  Kazuyoshi Miura

References

Other pages
 J. League official site
 Tokyo Verdy official site

Verdy Kawasaki
Tokyo Verdy seasons